Redwine is an unincorporated community and coal town in Morgan County, Kentucky, United States. Its post office  has closed.  Despite its name, Redwine is located in a dry county.

References

Unincorporated communities in Morgan County, Kentucky
Unincorporated communities in Kentucky
Coal towns in Kentucky